Adem Salihaj (born 25 December 1950) is a Kosovar Albanian politician who was a former deputy prime minister of Kosovo and was the acting prime minister of Kosovo from 8–25 March 2005. He represented the Democratic League of Kosovo.

Salihaj was born in the  Duraj village of Kaçanik. He studied Albanian language and literature in the Faculty of Philosophy of the University of Pristina. He worked for several years as a journalist of Bota e re (New world) newspaper and for the Radio Television of Pristina. Due to his political activities he was processed in court five times, imprisoned three times by the Yugoslav authorities, and spent a total of 12 years in jail. He was a signatory of the Kosovo Declaration of Independence.

Salihaj claims to have been the victim of an assassination attempt on June 12, 2000 which he believes was orchestrated by Kosovo's National Intelligence Service with the approval of Hashim Thaci.

In 2005, Salihahj was accused by the opposition Democratic Party of Kosovo and the ORA of being involved in organized crime. Salihaj and Speaker Nexhat Daci were removed from their posts in March 2006 after the death of Ibrahim Rugova and went on to form the Democratic League of Dardania.

Notes

References

Democratic League of Kosovo politicians
Living people
1950 births
Kosovo Albanians
People from Kaçanik
University of Pristina alumni
Yugoslav people of Albanian descent
Prisoners and detainees of Yugoslavia
Yugoslav journalists
Kosovan journalists